Helgi Hjörvar (born 9 June 1967 in Reykjavík, Iceland) is an Icelandic politician. He served as President of the Nordic Council in 2010.

References

External links 
 Non auto-biography of Helgi Hjörvar on the parliament website (English) 
 Non auto-biography of Helgi Hjörvar on the parliament website (Icelandic)

Helgi Hjorvar
Living people
1967 births
Blind people
Icelandic people with disabilities